Silver Spurs is a 1922 American silent Western film directed by Henry McCarty and starring Lester Cuneo, Bert Sprotte and Zalla Zarana.

Synopsis
Bored of life in Manhattan, Craig Hamilton travels west and enjoys a series of adventures.

Cast
 Lester Cuneo as Craig Hamilton
 Lillian Ward as Rosario del Camarillo 
 Bert Sprotte as Juan von Rolf
 Zalla Zarana as Carmencita 
 Clark Comstock as White Cloud
 Evelyn Selbie as Tehama
 Lafe McKee as Jerry Regan 
 Phil Gastrock as Padre Francisco
 Dorris Willott as Nona von Rolf

References

Bibliography
 Connelly, Robert B. The Silents: Silent Feature Films, 1910-36, Volume 40, Issue 2. December Press, 1998.
 Munden, Kenneth White. The American Film Institute Catalog of Motion Pictures Produced in the United States, Part 1. University of California Press, 1997.

External links
 

1922 films
1922 Western (genre) films
1920s English-language films
American silent feature films
Silent American Western (genre) films
Films directed by Henry McCarty
American black-and-white films
1920s American films